Healthy Athletes is an initiative run by the Special Olympics that offers athletes access to free health screenings and health information during local and international competitions. Health-care volunteers are present in 100 different countries and help people with intellectual disabilities receive adequate health care.

References

External links
Special Olympics

Special Olympics